Whores Moaning (or Whore's Moaning) is an EP by Sonic Youth released in February 1993. It was released exclusively in Australia to coincide with 1993 tour dates in Australia and New Zealand. The name of the EP was a reference to Nirvana's Australian tour EP Hormoaning, released the previous year.

Content
Basically consisting of the "Sugar Kane" single with some tweaking, it featured the radio edit of "Sugar Kane", "Personality Crisis" from a Sassy Magazine flexi-disc (recorded July 1990), a prototype instrumental of "Shoot" from December 1991 called "The End of the End of the Ugly", "Is It My Body" from the Sub Pop Alice Cooper tribute (recorded April 1991) and the lengthy instrumental "Tamra" from November 1991. The record was re-released in the United States on blue vinyl on April 16, 2011 for Record Store Day.

Packaging
The Kevin Kerslake cover artwork is a photocopy of one of Kurt Cobain's dolls. The back features a drawing by Cobain.

Track listing
 "Sugar Kane" (Edit) – 5:03
 "Personality Crisis" – 3:50
 "The End of the End of the Ugly" – 4:12
 "Is It My Body" – 2:53
 "Tamra" – 8:53

Charts

References

External links 

 Rolling Stone article
 NME article mentioning the EP

1993 EPs
Sonic Youth EPs
Geffen Records EPs